GT Racers is a 2004 game by British studio Aqua Pacific for PlayStation 2 and Windows and was released in 2006 for Game Boy Advance.

References

2004 video games
Aqua Pacific games
Game Boy Advance games
Multiplayer and single-player video games
Oxygen Games games
PlayStation 2 games
PlayStation Network games
Racing video games
Video games developed in the United Kingdom
Windows games